Igla may refer to:

 9K38 Igla, a man-portable surface-to-air missile (SAM)
 Igla (spacecraft docking system), Soyuz's orbital automatic docking radio telemetry
 Bella Igla (born 1985), Israeli female chess player
 Jonathan Igla, writer and producer
 International Gay and Lesbian Aquatics Association, the international governing body for gay and lesbian aquatics clubs
 The Needle (1988 film) (Igla), 1989 Soviet film directed by Rashid Nugmanov